The following outline is provided as an overview of and topical guide to the U.S. state of Connecticut:

Connecticut – state located in the New England region of the northeastern United States. Called the "Constitution State" or the "Nutmeg state", Connecticut has a long history dating from early colonial times and was influential in the development of the federal government.  Connecticut enjoys a temperate climate due to its long coastline on Long Island Sound.  Connecticut has the highest per capita income, Human Development Index, and median household income in the country.

General reference

 Names
 Common name: Connecticut
 Pronunciation: 
 Official name: State of Connecticut
 Abbreviations and name codes
 Postal symbol:  CT
 ISO 3166-2 code:  US-CT
 Internet second-level domain:  .ct.us
 Nicknames
Blue Law State
Brownstone State
 Constitution State (currently used on license plates)
Freestone State
 Land of Steady Habits
 Nutmeg State
 Provisions State
 Adjectival: Connecticut
 Demonyms:
 Connecticuter
 Nutmegger

Geography of Connecticut

Geography of Connecticut
 Connecticut is: a U.S. state, a federal state of the United States of America
 Location
 Northern hemisphere
 Western hemisphere
 Americas
 North America
 Anglo America
 Northern America
 United States of America
 Contiguous United States
 Eastern United States
 East Coast of the United States
 Northeastern United States
 New England
 Northeast megalopolis
 Population of Connecticut: 3,574,097 (2010 U.S. Census)
 Area of Connecticut:
 Atlas of Connecticut

Places in Connecticut

Places in Connecticut
 Historic places in Connecticut
 National Historic Landmarks in Connecticut
 National Register of Historic Places listings in Connecticut
 Bridges on the National Register of Historic Places in Connecticut
 Protected areas of Connecticut
National Natural Landmarks in Connecticut
State parks in Connecticut
 State forests in Connecticut
 State park trails in Connecticut
Nature centers in Connecticut

Environment of Connecticut

 Climate of Connecticut
 Climate change
 Connecticut Department of Energy and Environmental Protection
 Geology of Connecticut
 Superfund sites in Connecticut
 Wildlife of Connecticut
 Flora of Connecticut
 Fauna of Connecticut
 Birds of Connecticut
 Mammals of Connecticut

Natural geographic features of Connecticut

 Islands of Connecticut
 Rivers of Connecticut

Regions of Connecticut

Regions of Connecticut
 Northern Connecticut
 Northeastern Connecticut
 Northwestern Connecticut
 Southern Connecticut
 Southeastern Connecticut
 Southwestern Connecticut

Administrative divisions of Connecticut
Local government in Connecticut
 Towns in Connecticut (New England town)
 State capital of Connecticut: Hartford
 City nicknames in Connecticut
 Cities in Connecticut
 Unincorporated communities in Connecticut
 Census-designated places in Connecticut

Historic counties of the state of Connecticut
 Fairfield County
 Hartford County
 Litchfield County
 Middlesex County
 New Haven County
 New London County
 Tolland County
 Windham County

Demography of Connecticut

Demographics of Connecticut

Government and politics of Connecticut

Politics of Connecticut
 Form of government: U.S. state government
 United States congressional delegations from Connecticut
 Connecticut State Capitol
 Elections in Connecticut
 Political party strength in Connecticut

Branches of the government of Connecticut

Government of Connecticut

Executive branch of the government of Connecticut
Governor of Connecticut
Lieutenant Governor of Connecticut
 Secretary of State of Connecticut
 State departments
 Connecticut Department of Transportation

Legislative branch of the government of Connecticut

 Connecticut General Assembly (bicameral)
 Upper house: Connecticut Senate
 Lower house: Connecticut House of Representatives

Judicial branch of the government of Connecticut

Courts of Connecticut
 Supreme Court of Connecticut

Law and order in Connecticut

Law of Connecticut
 Adoption in Connecticut
 Cannabis in Connecticut
 Capital punishment  in Connecticut
 Individuals executed in Connecticut
 Constitution of Connecticut
 Gun laws in Connecticut
 Law enforcement in Connecticut
 Law enforcement agencies in Connecticut
 Connecticut State Police
 Same-sex marriage in Connecticut

Military in Connecticut
Connecticut Military Department
 Connecticut Adjutant General
 Connecticut State Militia
 Connecticut National Guard
 Connecticut Air National Guard
 103d Airlift Wing
 118th Airlift Squadron
 Connecticut Army National Guard
 102nd Infantry Regiment
 192nd Military Police Battalion
 Connecticut Naval Militia
 Governor's Guards
 Connecticut Department of Emergency Management and Homeland Security

Connecticut Wing Civil Air Patrol

National Reserves
 304th Infantry Regiment (United States)

Local government in Connecticut

Local government in Connecticut

History of Connecticut

History of Connecticut

History of Connecticut, by period 

Indigenous peoples
English Colony of Connecticut, 1636–1686
Pequot War, 1636–1637
Fundamental Orders of Connecticut, 1638
English Colony of New-Haven, 1637–1662
English Dominion of New-England in America, 1686–1689
English Colony of Connecticut, 1689–1707
History of Connecticut industry
British Colony of Connecticut, 1707–1776
King George's War, 1740–1748
Treaty of Aix-la-Chapelle of 1748
French and Indian War, 1754–1763
Treaty of Paris of 1763
Royal Proclamation of 1763
American Revolutionary War, April 19, 1775 – September 3, 1783
United States Declaration of Independence, July 4, 1776
Treaty of Paris, September 3, 1783
State of Connecticut since 1776
Sixth state to ratify the Articles of Confederation and Perpetual Union, signed July 9, 1778
Far western territorial claims ceded 1786
Fifth state to ratify the Constitution of the United States of America on January 9, 1788
Connecticut Western Reserve ceded 1800
Mexican–American War, April 25, 1846 – February 2, 1848
American Civil War, April 12, 1861 – May 13, 1865
Connecticut in the American Civil War
George W. Bush becomes 43rd President of the United States on January 20, 2001

History of Connecticut, by region 
 History of Bridgeport, Connecticut
 History of Brookfield, Connecticut
 History of Darien, Connecticut
 History of Greenwich, Connecticut
 History of Newtown, Connecticut
 History of Norwalk, Connecticut
 History of Stamford, Connecticut
 History of Trumbull, Connecticut
 History of West Haven, Connecticut
 History of Wilton, Connecticut

History of Connecticut, by subject 
 History of the Connecticut Constitution
 History of Connecticut industry

Culture of Connecticut
Culture of Connecticut
 Cuisine of Connecticut
 Museums in Connecticut
 Religion in Connecticut
 Roman Catholic Archdiocese of Hartford
 Roman Catholic Diocese of Norwich
 The Church of Jesus Christ of Latter-day Saints in Connecticut
 The First Cathedral
 Episcopal Diocese of Connecticut
 Scouting in Connecticut
 State symbols of Connecticut
 Flag of Connecticut
 Great Seal of the State of Connecticut

The Arts in Connecticut
Music of Connecticut

Sports in Connecticut
Sports in Connecticut

Economy and infrastructure of Connecticut

Economy of Connecticut
 Communications in Connecticut
 Newspapers in Connecticut
 Radio stations in Connecticut
 Television stations in Connecticut
 Health care in Connecticut
 Hospitals in Connecticut
 Connecticut Medical Examining Board
 Connecticut State Dental Commission
 Transportation in Connecticut
 Airports in Connecticut
 Roads in Connecticut
 U.S. Highways in Connecticut
 Interstate Highways in Connecticut

Education in Connecticut

Education in Connecticut
 Schools in Connecticut
 School districts in Connecticut
 High schools in Connecticut
 Colleges and universities in Connecticut
 University of Connecticut
 Yale University

See also

Topic overview:
Connecticut

Index of Connecticut-related articles

References

External links

Connecticut
Connecticut